Carr is an unincorporated community located northwest of McDade in Orange County, North Carolina,  United States. It is built up around the Carr general store. The main activities of this town were tobacco farming and logging.

References
 

Unincorporated communities in Orange County, North Carolina
Unincorporated communities in North Carolina